Lampland may refer to:

Carl Otto Lampland (1873–1951), American astronomer
Lampland (lunar crater)
Lampland (Martian crater)
1767 Lampland, an asteroid